Samuel Lutz Howard (March 8, 1891 – October 12, 1960) was a United States Marine Corps general who served  with distinction in the Marine Corps for thirty-eight years. In the early stages of World War II, General Howard commanded the 4th Marine Regiment on Bataan and Corregidor from December 7, 1941, to May 6, 1942. For distinguished service in that bitter encounter, he was awarded the Navy Cross.  Captured by the Japanese at Corregidor, he was forced to march many miles to a prison camp where he was held as a prisoner of war from 1942 until being liberated in 1945. He was the most senior U.S. Marine to be held captive during World War II. After the war, he continued to serve until 1953, including posts as commanding general of the 1st Marine Division, Commanding General of Marine Corps Recruit depot Parris Island S.C. from Feb. 2nd 1946 to Feb. 12 1946, and his final post as Inspector General of the Marine Corps.

Biography
Howard was born on March 8, 1891, in Washington, D.C.  He graduated from the Virginia Military Institute in 1912. He was commissioned a second lieutenant in the Marine Corps on May 11, 1914, at which time he reported for duty at the Marine Officers' School, Marine Barracks in Norfolk, Virginia.

Early military career
In August 1915, Howard was sent on his first tour of foreign duty to Port au Prince, Haiti, with a Marine Expeditionary regiment, which was sent to Haiti after two Americans were killed by snipers.

Two years of recruiting duty in Richmond, Virginia, and a year at the Marine Barracks, Washington, D.C., preceded the General's second tour of foreign duty, this time with the Second Brigade Marines in Santo Domingo in the Dominican Republic.

Returning to the United States in August 1924, he served at the Marine Corps Base, San Diego, California, with the Fourth Marine Regiment until assigned to the Field Officers' Course, Marine Corps Schools, Quantico, Virginia, the following year. Upon graduation in May 1926, he was assigned to duty at Marine Corps Headquarters in Washington, D.C., where he was a member of the War Plans Section, and later a member of the Commandant's Department (then John A. Lejeune).

In June 1929, Howard joined the United States occupation of Haiti, where his duties for the next years included chief of police and department commander, Port au Prince, Haiti. He was returned to the U.S. and assumed duties with the First Battalion, Seventh Marines, until August 1934, at which time he was again transferred to Marine Corps Headquarters.  From August 1934 until June 1938, he served as the executive officer, Division of Operations and Training, Headquarters Marine Corps.

In June 1938, he was ordered to the Naval War College in Newport, Rhode Island, as a student in the Senior Course. Following graduation, the Howard joined the Second Brigade, Fleet Marine Force, as commanding officer, Sixth Marine Regiment later becoming Brigade Executive Officer, and finally Division Chief of Staff of the Marine Division.  He was promoted to the rank of colonel in October 1938.

World War II
Eight months prior to the attack on Pearl Harbor, Howard went to China to take command of the Fourth Marines at Shanghai, assuming command on May 14, 1941.  In late November, the regiment was withdrawn from China, and arrived in the Philippines on December 2.

Five days later, Howard and the 4th Marines began the fight that lasted until the fall of Corregidor in May 1942. For his distinguished service during the bitter fighting at Bataan and Corregidor, he was awarded the Navy Cross.

Navy Cross citation:

Howard's Navy Cross citation reads in part:
 ...Colonel Howard successfully and efficiently employed his force in the defense of Olongapo until ordered to withdraw. The Regiment was then shifted to Corregidor where it rendered outstandingly courageous service in the defense of the beaches of that island fortress...

During the prolonged siege, Colonel Howard commanded all beach defenses... Although exposed to many and repeated bombing and strafing attacks, and terrific artillery bombardments, Colonel Howard displayed outstanding qualities of courage, leadership and efficiency under most difficult and hazardous conditions.

Howard was taken captive – and was the most senior U.S. Marine taken captive during World War II.  Howard remained a prisoner of war until liberated in August 1945. He was retroactively promoted to major general, effective March 30, 1942.

He was returned to the United States, and after several months, was ordered to the Marine Barracks, Parris Island, South Carolina, as Deputy Commanding General.  He served as acting commander from February 2, 1946 – February 12, 1946.

Post war years
Returning to China in September 1946, General Howard assumed command of the First Marine Division (Reinforced) with headquarters in Tientsin. Upon withdrawal of the First Marine Division from China in June 1947, he was transferred to Pearl Harbor to become commanding general, Marine Garrison Forces, Pacific, which post to be held until September 1, 1948, when he returned to the United States.

On September 10, 1948, he was ordered to Headquarters Marine Corps, Washington, D.C., as president of the Naval Examining Board and president of the Marine Corps Reserve Examining Board.

He assumed his final post as of Inspector General of the Marine Corps on June 6, 1950; holding the post for almost three years.

Retirement
Howard retired from the Marine Corps on March 31, 1953, and was advanced to the grade of lieutenant general.

Howard died on October 12, 1960, and was buried at Arlington National Cemetery.
He left behind his widow, Marianna Buckner Gray Howard, and two daughters, Nancy Howard Shepard, and Elizabeth Howard Richardson.

Awards and decorations
Lieutenant General Howard's decoration and medals include:

Notes

References
This article incorporates text in the public domain from the United States Marine Corps.

Further reading
 

1891 births
1960 deaths
Burials at Arlington National Cemetery
American prisoners of war in World War II
Bataan Death March prisoners
Recipients of the Navy Cross (United States)
United States Marine Corps generals
Virginia Military Institute alumni
World War II prisoners of war held by Japan
Naval War College alumni
United States Marine Corps personnel of World War I
United States Marine Corps World War II generals